Events in the year 2005 in Kerala.

Incumbents 

Governors of Kerala - R. L. Bhatia

Chief ministers of Kerala - Oommen Chandy

Events 

 January 4 - Minister P. K. Kunhalikutty submits resignation following Ice cream parlour sex scandal case.
 February 9 - Forest Minister K.P. Viswanathan resigns following remarks of Kerala High Court on him helping Sandalwood smuggling mafia.
 February 15 - A youth named Praveen was abducted and murdered in Kottayam district by a Dy.SP rank official of Kerala Police with the help of goons.
 May 1 – Democratic Indira Congress (Karunakaran) founded at Thrissur by K. Karunakaran following split from Indian National Congress.
 June 22 – Jawahar Navodaya Vidyalaya, Wayanad established.
 July 17 - Kodiyeri Balakrishnan moved a Motion of no confidence against First Chandy ministry.
 July 20 - Kanichukulangara murders by Himalayan Chit Fund Group promoters against rival chit business company. 
 July 28 –
 President of India A. P. J. Abdul Kalam addressed Kerala Legislative Assembly and presented a 'Vision 2010' for the state.
 Victers TV an educational entertainment channel in Malayalam language operated by Department of General and Higher Education (Kerala) launched.
 August 1 - Underpass at Palayam, Thiruvananthapuram inaugurated by Oommen Chandy. The works of the 300 m long underpass in middle of the city was completed in record time of seven and half months.
 September 9 - Tamil Nadu State Transport Corporation bus was hijacked and set ablaze near Kalamassery by followers of Abdul Nazer Mahdani for his release from prison in connection with 1998 Coimbatore bombings.
 September 27 – Custodial death of a youth named Udayakumar in custody of Fort Station, Kerala Police, Thiruvananthapuram.

Deaths 

 November 9 – K. R. Narayanan, former President of India.

See also 

 History of Kerala
 2005 in India

References 

2000s in Kerala